Scrabble is a word game in which two to four players score points by placing tiles, each bearing a single letter, onto a game board divided into a 15×15 grid of squares. The tiles must form words that, in crossword fashion, read left to right in rows or downward in columns and are included in a standard dictionary or lexicon.

The name Scrabble is a trademark of Mattel in most of the world, except in the United States and Canada, where it is a trademark of Hasbro, under the brands of both of its subsidiaries, Milton Bradley and Parker Brothers. The game is sold in 121 countries and is available in more than 30 languages; approximately 150 million sets have been sold worldwide, and roughly one-third of American and half of British homes have a Scrabble set. There are approximately 4,000 Scrabble clubs around the world.

Game details

The game is played by two to four players on a square game board imprinted with a 15×15 grid of cells (individually known as "squares"), each of which accommodates a single letter tile. In official club and tournament games, play is between two players or, occasionally, between two teams, each of which collaborates on a single rack.

The board is marked with "premium" squares, which multiply the number of points awarded: eight dark red "triple-word" squares, 17 pale red "double-word" squares, of which one, the center square (H8), is marked with a star or other symbol, 12 dark blue "triple-letter" squares, and 24 pale blue "double-letter" squares. In 2008, Hasbro changed the colors of the premium squares to orange for TW, red for DW, blue for DL, and green for TL, but the original premium square color scheme is still preferred for Scrabble boards used in tournaments.

In an English-language set, the game contains 100 tiles, 98 of which are marked with a letter and a point value ranging from 1 to 10. The number of points for each lettered tile is based on the letter's frequency in standard English. Commonly used letters such as vowels are worth one point, while less common letters score higher, with Q and Z each worth 10 points. The game also has two blank tiles that are unmarked and carry no point value. The blank tiles can be used as substitutes for any letter; once laid on the board, however, the choice is fixed. Other language sets use different letter set distributions with different point values.

Travelling versions of the game often have smaller tiles (e.g. ); sometimes they are magnetic to keep them in place. The capital letter is printed in black at the centre of the tile face and the letter's point value is printed in a smaller font at the bottom right corner.

S is one of the most versatile tiles in English-language Scrabble because it can be appended to many words to pluralize them (or in the case of most verbs, convert them to the third person singular present tense, as in the word PLUMMETS); Alfred Butts included only four S tiles to avoid making the game "too easy". Q is considered the most troublesome letter, as almost all words with it also contain U; a similar problem occurs in other languages like French, Dutch, Italian, and German. J is also difficult to play due to its low frequency and a scarcity of words having it at the end. C and V may be troublesome in the endgame, since no two-letter words with them exist, except for CH in the Collins Scrabble Words lexicon.

History

In 1938, the American architect Alfred Mosher Butts created the game as a variation on an earlier word game he invented, called Lexiko. The two games had the same set of letter tiles, whose distributions and point values Butts worked out by performing a frequency analysis of letters from various sources, including The New York Times. The new game, which he called Criss-Crosswords, added the 15×15 gameboard and the crossword-style gameplay. He manufactured a few sets himself but was not successful in selling the game to any major game manufacturers of the day.

In 1948, James Brunot, a resident of Newtown, Connecticut, and one of the few owners of the original Criss-Crosswords game, bought the rights to manufacture the game in exchange for granting Butts a royalty on every unit sold. Although he left most of the game (including the distribution of letters) unchanged, Brunot slightly rearranged the "premium" squares of the board and simplified the rules; he also renamed the game Scrabble, a real word which means "to scratch frantically". In 1949, Brunot and his family made sets in a converted former schoolhouse in Dodgingtown, Connecticut, a section of Newtown. They made 2,400 sets that year but lost money. According to legend, Scrabbles big break came in 1952 when Jack Straus, president of Macy's, played the game on vacation. Upon returning from vacation, he was surprised to find that his store did not carry the game. He placed a large order, and within a year, "everyone had to have one".

In 1952, unable to meet demand himself, Brunot sold manufacturing rights to Long Island-based Selchow and Righter, one of the manufacturers who, like Parker Brothers and Milton Bradley Company, had previously rejected the game. Harriet T. Righter licensed the game from entrepreneur James Brunot in 1952. "It's a nice little game. It will sell well in bookstores," she remembered saying about Scrabble when she first saw it. In its second year as a Selchow and Righter product, 1954, nearly four million sets were sold.

Selchow and Righter bought the trademark to the game in 1972. JW Spear (since 1994 a subsidiary of Mattel) began selling the game very successfully in Australia and the UK on January 19, 1955. In 1986, Selchow and Righter was sold to Coleco, which soon afterward went bankrupt. Hasbro purchased the company's assets, including Scrabble and Parcheesi.

In 1984, Scrabble was turned into a daytime game show on NBC. The Scrabble game show ran from July 1984 to March 1990, with a second run from January to June 1993. The show was hosted by Chuck Woolery. Its tagline in promotional broadcasts was, "Every man dies; not every man truly Scrabbles." In 2011, a new TV variation of Scrabble, called Scrabble Showdown, aired on The Hub cable channel, which is a joint venture of Discovery Communications, Inc. and Hasbro.

Scrabble was inducted into the National Toy Hall of Fame in 2004.

Evolution of the rules
The "box rules" included in each copy of the North American edition have been edited four times: in 1953, 1976, 1989, and 1999.

The major changes in 1953 were as follows.
 It was made clear that:
 words could be played through single letters already on the board,
 a player could play a word parallel and immediately adjacent to an existing word provided all crossing words formed were valid,
 the effect of two premium squares was to be compounded multiplicatively.
 The previously unspecified penalty for having one's play successfully challenged was stated: withdrawal of tiles and loss of turn.

The major changes in 1976 were as follows.
 It was made clear that the blank tile beats an A when drawing to see who goes first.
 A player could pass their turn, doing nothing.
 A loss-of-turn penalty was added for challenging an acceptable play.
 If final scores are tied, the player whose score was highest before adjusting for unplayed tiles is the winner; in tournament play, a tie is counted as half a win for both players.

The editorial changes made in 1989 did not affect gameplay.

The major changes in 1999 were as follows.
 It was made clear that:
 a tile can be shifted or replaced until the play has been scored,
 a challenge applies to all the words made in the given play.
 Playing all seven tiles is officially called a "bingo" in North America and a "bonus" elsewhere.
 A change in the wording of the rules could have been interpreted as meaning that a player may form more than one word on one row on a single turn.

Rules

Notation system
In the notation system common in tournament play, columns are labeled with the letters "A–O" and rows with the numbers "1–15". (On Scrabble boards manufactured by Mattel as well as on the Internet Scrabble Club, rows are lettered while columns are numbered instead.) A play is usually identified in the format xy WORD score or WORD xy score, where x denotes the column or row on which the play's main word extends, y denotes the second coordinate of the main word's first letter, and WORD is the main word. Although it is unnecessary, additional words formed by the play are sometimes listed after the main word and a slash. When the play of a single tile forms words in each direction, one of the words is arbitrarily chosen to serve as the main word for purposes of notation.

When a blank tile is employed in the main word, the letter it has been chosen to represent is indicated with a lower case letter, or, in handwritten notation, with a square around the letter. When annotating a play, previously existing letters on the board are usually enclosed in parentheses; alternatively, the number of tiles placed on the board can be noted.

Exchanges are often annotated by a minus sign followed by the tiles that were exchanged alphabetically; for example, if a player holds EIIISTU, exchanging two I's and a U would be denoted as "−IIU".

The image at right gives examples of valid plays and how they would typically be annotated using the notation system.

Additionally, a number of symbols have been employed to indicate the validity of words in different lexica:
 An asterisk (*) means an illegal, or phony, word.
 A hash symbol (#) means a word valid in games using the British-originated word list (CSW) only.
 A dollar symbol ($) means a word valid in games using the American-originated word list (TWL) only.
 An exclamation mark (!) means a word judged to be offensive, and thus valid in tournament games only.

Sequence of play
Before the game, a resource, either a word list or a dictionary, is selected to adjudicate any challenges during the game. The tiles are either put in an opaque bag or placed face down on a flat surface. Opaque cloth bags and customized tiles are staples of clubs and tournaments, where games are rarely played without both.

Next, players decide the order in which they play. The normal approach is for players to each draw one tile. The player who picks the letter closest to the beginning of the alphabet goes first, with blank tiles taking precedence over the letter A. In most North American tournaments, the rules of the NASPA Games organization stipulate instead that players who have gone first in the fewest previous games in the tournament go first, and when that rule yields a tie, those who have gone second the most go first. If there is still a tie, tiles are drawn as in the standard rules.

At the beginning of the game, each player draws seven tiles from the bag and places them on their rack, concealed from the other player(s).

Making a play
The first played word must be at least two letters long, and cover H8 (the center square). Thereafter, any move is made by using one or more tiles to place a word on the board. This word may use one or more tiles already on the board and must join with the cluster of tiles already on the board.

On each turn, the player has three options:
 Pass, forfeiting the turn and scoring nothing.
 Exchange one or more tiles for an equal number from the bag, scoring nothing, an option available only if at least seven tiles remain in the bag.
 Play at least one tile on the board, adding the value of all words formed to the player's cumulative score.

A proper play uses one or more of the player's tiles to form a continuous string of letters that make a word (the play's "main word") on the board, reading either left-to-right or top-to-bottom. The main word must either use the letters of one or more previously played words or else have at least one of its tiles horizontally or vertically adjacent to an already played word. If any words other than the main word are formed by the play, they are scored as well and are subject to the same criteria of acceptability. See Scoring for more details.

A blank tile may represent any letter and scores zero points, regardless of its placement or what letter it represents. Its placement on a double-word or triple-word square causes the corresponding premium to be applied to the word(s) in which it is used. Once a blank tile is placed, it remains that particular letter for the remainder of the game.

After making a play, the player announces the score for that play, and then, if the game is being played with a clock, starts the opponent's clock. The player can change their play as long as the player's clock is running, but commits to the play when they start the opponent's clock. The player then draws tiles from the bag to replenish their rack to seven tiles. If there are not enough tiles in the bag to do so, the player takes all the remaining tiles.

If a player has made a play and has not yet drawn a tile, the opponent may choose to challenge any or all words formed by the play. The player challenged must then look up the words in question using a specified word source (such as the NASPA Word List, the Official Scrabble Players Dictionary, or Collins Scrabble Words), and if one or more of them is found to be unacceptable, the play is removed from the board, the player returns the newly played tiles to their rack, and the turn is forfeited. In tournament play, a challenge may be to the entire play or any one or more words formed in the play, and judges (human or computer) are used, so players are not entitled to know which word(s) are invalid. Penalties for unsuccessfully challenging an acceptable play vary in club and tournament play and are described in greater detail below.

End of game

Under North American tournament rules, the game ends when either:
 One player has played every tile on their rack, and no tiles remain in the bag (regardless of the tiles on the opponent's rack).
 At least six successive scoreless turns have occurred and either player decides to end the game.
 Either player uses more than 10 minutes of overtime. (For several years, a game could not end with a cumulative score of 0–0, but that is no longer the case, and such games have since occurred a number of times in tournament play, the winner being the player with the lower total point value on their rack and thus a score less negative than the opponent's.)

When the game ends, each player's score is reduced by the sum of their unused letters; in addition, if a player has used all of their letters (known as "going out" or "playing out"), the sum of all other players' unused letters is added to that player's score. In tournament play, a player who goes out adds twice that sum, and their opponent is not penalized.

Examples
Plays can be made in several ways (in what follows, it is assumed that the word JACK has been played on a previous turn; letters in parentheses represent tiles already on the board):
 Adding one or more letters to an existing word, e.g. (JACK)S, HI(JACK), HI(JACK)ING, (JACK)FRUIT.
 "Hooking" a word and playing perpendicular to that word, e.g. playing IONIZES with the S hooked on (JACK) to make (JACK)S.
 Playing perpendicular to a word, e.g. YEU(K)Y through the K in (JACK).
 Playing parallel to a word(s) forming several short words, e.g. CON played under (JACK) simultaneously forming (J)O and (A)N.

Any combination of these is allowed in a play, as long as all the letters placed on the board in one play lie in one row or column and are connected by a main word, and any run of tiles on two or more consecutive squares along a row or column constitutes a valid word.

Words must read either left-to-right or top-to-bottom. Diagonal plays are not allowed.

Scoring

The score for any play is determined this way:
 Each new word formed in a play is scored separately, and then those scores are added up. The value of each tile is indicated on the tile, and blank tiles are worth zero points.
 The main word (defined as the word containing every played letter) is scored. The letter values of the tiles are added up, and tiles placed on Double Letter Score (DLS) and Triple Letter Score (TLS) squares are doubled or tripled in value, respectively. Tiles placed on Double Word Score (DWS) or Triple Word Score (TWS) squares double or triple the value of the word(s) that include those tiles, respectively. In particular, the center square (H8) is considered a DWS, and the first play is doubled in value.
 If any "hook" words are played (e.g. playing ANEROID while "hooking" the A to BETTING to make ABETTING), the scores for each word are added separately. This is common for "parallel" plays that make up to eight words in one turn.
 Premium squares apply only when newly placed tiles cover them. Any subsequent plays do not count those premium squares.
 If a player covers both letter and word premium squares with a single word, the letter premium(s) is/are calculated first, followed by the word premium(s).
 If a player makes a play where the main word covers two DWS squares, the value of that word is doubled, then redoubled (i.e. 4× the word value). Similarly, if the main word covers two TWS squares, the value of that word is tripled, then re-tripled (9× the word value). Such plays are often referred to as "double-doubles" and "triple-triples" respectively. It is theoretically possible to achieve a play covering three TWS squares (a 27× word score), although this is extremely improbable without constructive setup and collaboration. Plays covering a DWS and a TWS simultaneously (6× the word value, or 18× if a DWS and two TWS squares are covered) are only possible if a player misses the center star on the first turn, and the play goes unchallenged (this is valid under North American tournament rules).
 Finally, if seven tiles have been laid on the board in one turn, known as a "bingo" in North America and as a "bonus" elsewhere, after all of the words formed have been scored, 50 bonus points are added.

When the letters to be drawn have run out, the final play can often determine the winner. This is particularly the case in close games with more than two players.

Scoreless turns can occur when a player passes, exchanges tiles, or loses a challenge. The latter rule varies slightly in international tournaments. A scoreless turn can also theoretically occur if a play consists of only blank tiles, but this is extremely unlikely in actual play.

Example
Suppose Player 1 plays QUANT 8D, with the Q on a DLS and T on the center star. The score for this play would be (2 × 10 + 1 + 1 + 1 + 1) × 2 = 48 (following the order of operations).

Player 2 extends the play to ALI(QUANT) 8A with the A on the TWS at 8A. The score for this play would be (1 + 1 + 1 + 10 + 1 + 1 + 1 + 1) × 3 = 51. Note that the Q is not doubled for this play.

Player 1 has DDIIIOO and plays OIDIOID 9G. The score for the word OIDIOID would be (2 × 1 + 1 + 2 × 2 + 1 + 1 + 1 + 2 × 2) = 14. Additionally, Player 1 formed NO and TI, which score 1 + 2 × 1 = 3 and 1 + 1 = 2 points respectively. Therefore, the sum of all the values of the words formed is 14+3+2 = 19. But since this is a seven-letter play, 50 points are added, resulting in a total score of 69. Player 1 now has a 117–51 lead.

The player with the highest final score wins the game. In case of a tie, the player with the highest score before adjusting for unplayed tiles wins the game. In tournament play, a tie counts as 1/2 a win for both players.

Acceptable words

Acceptable words are the primary entries in some agreed dictionary or lexicon, and all of their inflected forms. Words that are hyphenated, capitalized (such as proper nouns), or apostrophized are not allowed unless they also appear as acceptable entries; JACK is a proper noun, but the word JACK is acceptable because it has other usages as a common noun (automotive, vexillological, etc.) and verb that are acceptable. Acronyms or abbreviations, other than those that have acceptable entries (such as AWOL, RADAR, LASER, and SCUBA) are not allowed. Variant spellings, slang or offensive terms, archaic or obsolete terms, and specialized jargon words are allowed if they meet all other criteria for acceptability, but archaic spellings (e.g. NEEDE for NEED) are generally not allowed. Foreign words are not allowed in English-language Scrabble unless they have been incorporated into the English language, as with PATISSERIE, KILIM, and QI. Vulgar and offensive words are generally excluded from the OSPD but allowed in club and tournament play, but in 2020, the rise of anti-racism protests caused trademark owners and lexicon compilers to exclude words deemed to be personally applicable offensive slurs, resulting in their expurgation, while retaining other offensive words.

Proper nouns and other exceptions to the usual rules are allowed in some limited contexts in the spin-off game Scrabble Trickster. Names of recognized computer programs are permitted as an acceptable proper noun (for example, WinZip).

The memorization of two-letter words is considered an essential skill in this game.

There are two popular competition word lists for English-language Scrabble:
 NASPA Word List (NWL, also known as OTCWL, OWL, or TWL)
 Collins Scrabble Words (CSW, also called "Collins" or "SOWPODS")
The first predominates in the U.S., Canada, Israel and Thailand, and the second in English Scrabble in the rest of the world. There is also a large community of competitive Collins players in North America, with its own NASPA rating system.

NWL and OSPD
Today's NASPA Word List, published by NASPA Games, descends from the Official Tournament and Club Word List (a non-bowdlerized version of the Official Scrabble Players Dictionary) and its companion Long Words List for longer words. The current version of NWL is NWL2020, effective January 2021, and the Official Scrabble Players Dictionary, published by Merriam-Webster, is currently in its sixth edition of 2018. NWL includes all current OSPD words, plus several hundred offensive words and genericized trademarks such as KLEENEX; as of 2020, it no longer includes words judged to be personally applicable offensive slurs.

The NWL and OSPD are compiled using a number of major college-level dictionaries, principally those published by Merriam-Webster. If a word appears, at least historically, in any one of the dictionaries, it is included in the NWL and the OSPD. If the word has only an offensive meaning, it is included only in the NWL. The key difference between the OSPD and the NWL is that the OSPD is marketed for "home and school" use, without words which their source dictionaries judged offensive, rendering the Official Scrabble Players Dictionary less fit for official Scrabble play. The OSPD is available in bookstores, while the NWL is available only through NASPA.

Collins Scrabble Words
In all other English-speaking countries, the competition word list is Collins Scrabble Words 2019 edition, known as CSW19. (Versions of this lexicon before 2007 were known as SOWPODS.) The lexicon includes all allowed words 2 to 15 letters long. Historically, this list has contained all OTCWL words plus words sourced from Chambers and Collins English dictionaries, but recent editorial decisions have caused greater discrepancies between CSW and NWL. This book is used to adjudicate at the World Scrabble Championship and all other major international competitions outside North America.

Tournaments are also played using CSW in North America, particularly since Hasbro ceased to control tournament play in 2009. NASPA officially rates CSW tournaments alongside NWL tournaments, using a separate rating system.

Challenges

The penalty for a successfully challenged play is nearly universal: the offending player removes the tiles played and forfeits their turn. (In some online games, an option known as "void" may be used, wherein unacceptable words are automatically rejected by the program. The player is then required to make another play, with no penalty applied.)

The penalty for an unsuccessful challenge (where all words formed by the play are deemed valid) varies considerably, including:
 "Double Challenge", in which an unsuccessfully challenging player must forfeit the next turn. This penalty governs North American (NASPA-sanctioned) OWL tournament play, and is the standard for North American, Israeli, and Thai clubs. Because loss of a turn generally constitutes the greatest risk for an unsuccessful challenge, it provides the greatest incentive for a player to "bluff", or play a "phony" – a plausible word that they know or suspect to be unacceptable, hoping their opponent will not challenge it. Or a player can put down a legal word that appears to be a phony hoping the other player will incorrectly challenge it and lose their turn.
 "Single Challenge"/"Free Challenge", in which no penalty whatsoever is applied to a player who unsuccessfully challenges. This is the default rule in Ireland and the United Kingdom, as well as for many tournaments in Australia, although these countries do sanction occasional tournaments using other challenge rules.
 Modified "Single Challenge", in which an unsuccessful challenge does not result in the loss of the challenging player's turn, but is penalized by the loss of a specified number of points. The most common penalty is five points. The rule has been adopted in Singapore (since 2000), Malaysia (since 2002), South Africa (since 2003), New Zealand (since 2004), and Kenya, as well as in contemporary World Scrabble Championships (since 2001) and North American (NASPA-sanctioned) Collins tournaments, and particularly prestigious Australian tournaments. Some countries and tournaments (including Sweden) use a 10-point penalty instead. In most game situations, this penalty is much lower than that of the "double challenge" rule. Consequently, such tournaments encourage greater willingness to challenge and discourage playing dubious words.

Under NASPA tournament rules, a player may request to "hold" the opponent's play to consider whether to challenge it, provided that the opponent has not yet drawn replacement tiles. If player A holds, player A's clock still runs, and player B may not draw provisional replacement tiles until 15 seconds after the hold was announced (which tiles must then be kept separate). There is no limit on how long player A may hold the play. If player A successfully challenges after player B drew provisional replacement tiles, player B must show the drawn tiles before returning them to the bag.

Competitive play

Club and tournament play

Tens of thousands play club and tournament Scrabble worldwide. All tournament (and most club) games are played with a game clock and a set time control. Although casual games are often played with unlimited time, this is problematic in competitive play among players for whom the number of evident legal plays is immense. Almost all tournament games involve only two players; typically, each has 25 minutes in which to make all of their plays. For each minute by which a player oversteps the time control, a penalty of 10 points is assessed. The number of minutes is rounded up, so, for example, if a player oversteps time control by two minutes and five seconds, the penalty is 30 points. Some games count the time by fractions of a minute. Also, most players use molded plastic tiles, not engraved like the original wooden tiles, eliminating the potential for a cheating player to "braille" (feel for particular tiles, especially blanks, in the bag).

Players are allowed "tracking sheets", pre-printed with the letters in the initial pool, from which tiles can be crossed off as they are played. Tracking tiles is an important aid to strategy, especially during the endgame, when no tiles remain to be drawn and each player can determine exactly what is on the opponent's rack.

Notable and regularly held tournaments include:
 The World Scrabble Championship: held in odd years up until 2013, when it was announced by Mattel that it would be called the Scrabble Champions Tournament and be held annually in subsequent years.
 The Scrabble Players Championship (formerly North American Scrabble Championship): organized by NASPA Games, an open event attracting several hundred players, held around July–August every year in the United States.
 The National Scrabble Championship: organized by the Association of British Scrabble Players (ABSP) and held every year in the United Kingdom.
 The Brand's Crossword Game King's Cup: the largest tournament in the world. Held annually in Thailand around the end of June or the beginning of July.
 The UK Open: the largest Scrabble tournament in Europe, held annually in Coventry in England, since 2008.

Other important tournaments include:
 The World Youth Scrabble Championships: entry by country qualification, restricted to under 18 years old. Held annually since 2006.
 The National School Scrabble Championship: entry open to North American school students. Held annually since 2003.
 The Canadian Scrabble Championship: entry by invitation only to the top fifty Canadian players. Held every two to three years.
 The Singapore Open Scrabble Championship: international Singapore championship held annually since 1997.

Clubs in North America typically meet one day a week for three or four hours and some charge a small admission fee to cover their expenses and prizes. Clubs also typically hold at least one open tournament per year. Tournaments are usually held on weekends, and between six and nine games are played each day.

There are also clubs in the UK and many other countries. There are a number of internationally rated SOWPODS tournaments.

During off-hours at tournaments, many players socialize by playing consultation (team) Scrabble, Clabbers, Anagrams, Boggle, Words with Friends, Scramble with Friends and other games.

Records
The following records were achieved during international competitive club or tournament play, according to authoritative sources, including the book Everything Scrabble by Joe Edley and John D. Williams Jr. (revised edition, Pocket Books, 2001) and the Scrabble FAQ. When available, separate records are listed based upon different official word lists:
 OTCWL, the North American list, also used in Thailand and Israel, known today as the NASPA Word List (NWL);
 OSW, formerly the official list in the UK;
 SOWPODS, the combined OTCWL+OSW list now used in much of the world, known today as Collins Scrabble Words.
To date, new editions or revisions of these lists have not been considered substantial enough to warrant separate record-keeping.
 High game (OTCWL) – 830 by Michael Cresta (Mass.), at the Lexington (Mass.) club, October 12, 2006. Cresta defeated Wayne Yorra 830–490.
 High game (OTCWL) in a tournament game – 803 by Joel Sherman (N.Y.), at a tournament in Stamford, Conn., December 9, 2011. Sherman defeated Bradley Robbins 803–285, playing a record-tying seven bingos and sticking Robbins with the Q.
 High game (OSW) – 793 by Peter Preston (UK), 1999.
 High game (SOWPODS) – Toh Weibin set a record score of 850 at the Northern Ireland Championships on January 21, 2012. The winning margin of 591 points is also believed to be a record.
 High combined score (OTCWL) – 1320 (830–490) by Michael Cresta and Wayne Yorra, in a Lexington, Mass., club, 2006.
 High combined score (OTCWL) in a tournament game – 1134 (582–552) by Keith Smith (Tex.) and Stefan Rau (Conn.), Round 12 of the 2008 Dallas Open. (Rau's losing score of 552 included three phony words that were not challenged.)
 High combined score (OTCWL) in a tournament game with no phony words played – 1127 (725–402) by Laurie Cohen (Ariz.) and Nigel Peltier (Wash.), in a tournament in Ahwatukee, Arizona, February 16, 2009.
 High combined score (SOWPODS) – 1210 (721–489) by Edward Okulicz (Australia and Michael McKenna (Australia), at the 2013 Janboree in NSW.
 Highest losing score (OTCWL) – 552 by Stefan Rau (Conn.) to Keith Smith's (Tex.) 582, Round 12 of the 2008 Dallas Open.
 Highest tie game (OTCWL) – 502–502 by John Chew and Zev Kaufman, at a 1997 Toronto Club tournament.
 Highest tie game (SOWPODS) – 532–532 by Sinatarn Pattanasuwanna (Thailand) and Tawan Paepolsiri (Thailand) at the 2012 World Youth Scrabble Championship.
 Highest opening move score (OTCWL) – MuZJIKS (with a blank for the U) 126 by Jesse Inman (S.C.) at the National Scrabble Championship, 2008. The highest possible legal score on a first turn is MUZJIKS 128, using an actual U rather than a blank. (Note: The odds of drawing MUZJIKS without blanks is 9 in 432,325,411, or 1 in )
 Highest opening move score (SOWPODS) – BEZIQUE 124 by Sam Kantimathi (1993), Joan Rosenthal and Sally Martin.
 Highest single play (OTCWL) –  QUIXOTRY  365 by Michael Cresta (Mass.), 2006.
 Highest single play (SOWPODS) – CAZIQUES 392 by Karl Khoshnaw.
 Highest average score, multi-day tournament (OSPD) – 503 by James Leong (Sask.) over 12 rounds at Brandon, Man., 2015. 484 by Doug Brockmeier (Calif.) over 12 rounds at Elmhurst, Ill., 2011. 471 by Chris Cree (Tex.) over 18 rounds at the Bayou Bash in Houston, Tex., 2007.
 Highest average score, multi-day tournament (SOWPODS) – 499.94 by Nigel Richards (MY) over 16 rounds at the 7th Lim Boon Heng Cup, Singapore, 2009.
 Highest average score, one day tournament (SOWPODS) – 548 by Jackson Smylie of Toronto, Ontario over 5 rounds at Caledon, Ontario
 Highest average score, one day tournament (OTCWL) – 532 by Jackson Smylie  over 4 rounds at North American Scrabble Championship early bird in Las Vegas

Two other records are believed to have been achieved under a British format known as the "high score rule", in which a player's tournament result is determined only by the player's own scores, and not by the differentials between that player's scores and the opponents'. Play in this system "encourages elaborate setups often independently mined by the two players", and is significantly different from the standard game in which defensive considerations play a major role. While the "high score" rule has led to impressively high records, it is currently out of favor.
 High game score of 1,049 by Phil Appleby of Lymington, Hampshire, UK, on June 25, 1989, in Wormley, Hertfordshire, UK. His opponent scored just 253 points, giving Appleby a record victory margin of 796 points.
 High single-turn score of 392, by Dr Saladin Karl Khoshnaw in Manchester, UK, in April 1982. The word he used was CAZIQUES, meaning "native chiefs of West Indian aborigines".

Hypothetical scores in possible and legal but highly unlikely plays and games are far higher, primarily through the use of words that cover three triple-word-score squares. The highest reported score for a single play is 1780 (OSPD) and 1785 (SOWPODS) using oxyphenbutazone. When only adding the word sesquioxidizing to these official lists, one could theoretically score 2015 (OSPD) and 2044 (SOWPODS) points in a single move.
The highest reported combined score for a theoretical game based on SOWPODS is 4046 points, constructed by Nathan Hedt of Australia.
Other records are available for viewing at Total Scrabble, an unofficial record book that includes the above as sources and expands on other topics.

In August 1984, Peter Finan and Neil Smith played Scrabble for 153 hours at St. Anselm's College, Birkenhead, Merseyside, setting a new duration record. A longer record was never recorded by Guinness Book of Records, as the publishers decided that duration records of this nature were becoming too dangerous and stopped accepting them.

Software

Computer players
Maven is a computer opponent for the game created by Brian Sheppard. The official Scrabble computer game in North America uses a version of Maven as its artificial intelligence and is published by Atari. Outside North America, the official Scrabble computer game is published by Ubisoft. Quackle is an open-source alternative to Maven of comparable strength, created by a five-person team led by Jason Katz-Brown. A Qt cross-platform version of Quackle is available on GitHub.

Video game versions
Video game versions of Scrabble have been released for various platforms, including IBM PC compatibles, Mac, Amiga, Commodore 64, ZX Spectrum, Game Boy, Game Boy Color, Game Boy Advance, Nintendo DS, PlayStation, PlayStation 4, PlayStation Portable, iPod, iOS, Game.com, Palm OS, Amstrad CPC, Xbox 360, Kindle, Wii, and mobile phones.

The Nintendo DS version of Scrabble 2007 Edition made news when parents became angry over the game's AI using potentially offensive language during gameplay.

Web versions
Several websites offer the possibility to play Scrabble online against other users, such as ScrabbleScores.com, the Internet Scrabble Club and Pogo.com from Electronic Arts (North America only).

Facebook initially offered a variation of Scrabble called Scrabulous as a third-party application add-on. On July 24, 2008, Hasbro filed a copyright infringement lawsuit against its developers. Four days later, Scrabulous was disabled for users in North America, eventually reappearing as "Lexulous" in September 2008, with changes made to distinguish it from Scrabble. By December 20, Hasbro had withdrawn its lawsuit.

Mattel launched its official version of online Scrabble, Scrabble by Mattel, on Facebook in late March 2008. The application was developed by Gamehouse, a division of RealNetworks that was licensed by Mattel. Since Hasbro controls the copyright for North America with the copyright for the rest of the world belonging to Mattel, the Gamehouse Facebook application was available only to players outside the United States and Canada. The version developed by Electronic Arts for Hasbro was available throughout the world.

When Gamehouse ceased support for its application, Mattel replaced it with the Electronic Arts version in May 2013. This decision was met with criticism from its userbase. The Hasbro version continues to be available worldwide but now uses IP lookup to display Hasbro branding to North American players and Mattel branding to the rest of the world. Electronic Arts have also released mobile apps for Android and iOS, allowing players to continue the same game on more than one platform.

As well as facilities to play occasional games online, there are many options to play in leagues.

In 2020, the license for Scrabble passed from Electronic Arts to Scopely, which launched the app Scrabble GO on March 5, 2020, with the Electronic Arts version discontinued on June 5, 2020. The new app was very different, leading to protests, and Scopely soon began to offer a 'Classic' version, without some of the extras initially offered: "this updated mode is reimagined to reflect the ask for a streamlined experience. Features such as boosts, rewards and all other game modes are disabled", the company announced.

Variations

Super Scrabble

A new licensed product, Super Scrabble, was launched in North America by Winning Moves Games in 2004 under license from Hasbro, with the deluxe version (with turntable and lock-in grid) released in February 2007. A Mattel-licensed product for the rest of the world was released by Tinderbox Games in 2006. This set comprises 200 tiles in slightly modified distribution to the standard set and a 21×21 playing board.

National versions

Versions of the game have been released in several other languages.

The game was called Alfapet when it was introduced in Sweden in 1954, but since the mid-1990s, the game has also been known as Scrabble in Sweden. Alfapet is now another crossword game, developed by the owners of the name Alfapet. A Russian version is called Erudit. Versions have been prepared for Dakotah, Haitian Creole, Dakelh (Carrier language), and Tuvan.

For languages with digraphs counted as single letters, such as Welsh and Hungarian, the game features separate tiles for those digraphs.

An Irish-language version of Scrabble was published by Glór na nGael in 2010. The previous year the same organisation published the Junior version of the game and two years later it republished Junior Scrabble using a two-sided (and two skill level) board.

Television game show versions

In 1987, a board game was released by Selchow & Righter, based on the game show hosted by Chuck Woolery that aired on NBC from 1984 to 1990 (and for five months in 1993). Billed as the "Official Home Version" of the game show (or officially as the "TV Scrabble Home Game"), gameplay bears more resemblance to the game show than it does to a traditional Scrabble game, although it does utilize a traditional Scrabble gameboard in play.

On September 17, 2011, a new game show based on Scrabble, called Scrabble Showdown, debuted on The Hub with Justin "Kredible" Willman as the host of the program. Each week, teams play various activities based on the board game in order to win big prizes including a trip to anywhere from around the world.

Games based on Scrabble

There are numerous variations of the game. While they are similar to the original Scrabble game, they include minor variations. For example, Literati draws random tiles instead of providing a finite number of tiles for the game, assigns different point levels to each letter and has a slightly different board layout, whereas Lexulous assigns eight letters to each player instead of seven. Words with Friends uses a different board layout and different letter values, as does Words of Gold.

Duplicate Scrabble is a popular variant in French speaking countries. Every player has the same letters on the same board and the players must submit a paper slip at the end of the allotted time (usually 3 minutes) with the highest scoring word they have found. This is the format used for the French World Scrabble Championships but it is also used in Romanian and Dutch. There is no limit to the number of players that can be involved in one game, and at Vichy in 1998 there were 1,485 players, a record for French Scrabble tournaments.

 is a variant that is much more popular in Italy than the original game. It features a 17×17 grid of cells and peculiar rules.

In one variation of Scrabble, blanks score points corresponding to the letters the blanks are used to represent. For example, if one played blank to represent a Z, it would get ten; a blank to represent a V or an H would get four; a blank to represent a D would get 2 and blank to represent a T, N, L, S or R or any of the vowels would get one.

Popular among tournament Scrabble players is Clabbers. In Clabbers, any move that consists of anagrams of allowable words is allowed. For example, because ETAERIO is allowable in ordinary Collins Scrabble, EEAIORT would be allowable in Clabbers.

A junior version, called Junior Scrabble, has been marketed. This has slightly different distributions of frequencies of letter tiles to the standard Scrabble game.

Word games similar to or influenced by Scrabble include Bananagrams, Boggle, Dabble, Nab-It!, Perquackey, Puzzlage, Quiddler, Scribbage, Tapple, Upwords, and WordSpot.

There are also number-based variations, such as Equate (game), GoSum, Mathable, Numble, Numbler, Triolet, Yushino and Numenko.

Gameboard formats
The game has been released in numerous gameboard formats appealing to various user groups. The original boards included wood tiles and many "deluxe" sets still do.

Tile Lock editions
Tile Lock editions of Scrabble and Super Scrabble are made by Winning Moves and feature smaller, plastic tiles that are held in place on the board with little plastic posts. The standard version features exactly the same 100 tiles as regular Scrabble. The Tile Lock Super Scrabble features the same 200 tiles that are in Super Scrabble.

Travel editions
Editions are available for travelers who may wish to play in a conveyance such as a train or plane or to pause a game in progress and resume later. Many versions thus include methods to keep letters from moving, such as pegboards, recessed tile holders and magnetic tiles. Players' trays are also designed with stay-fast holders. Such boards are also typically designed to be reoriented by each player to put the board upright during the game, as well as folded and stowed with the game in progress.
 Production and Marketing Company, 1954 – metal hinged box, Bakelite tiles inlaid with round magnets, chrome tile racks, silver-colored plastic bag and cardboard box covered with decorative paper. The box, when opened flat, measures  and the tiles measure  square.
 Spear's Games, the 1980s – boxed edition with pegboard, plastic tiles with small feet to fit snugly in the pegboard. Racks are clear plastic, allowing some sorting while holding tiles fairly snugly. The set comes with a drawstring plastic bag to draw tiles and a cardboard box. It is possible to save a game in progress by returning the board to the box. There is a risk of players' trays being mixed and upset, and the box lid, held on by friction, is subject to upset.
 Selchow & Righter, 1980s – pocket edition with plastic "magnetic" board and tiles. Tile racks are also plastic with an asymmetrical shape to provide a handhold. All elements fit in a plastic envelope for travel and to permit a pause in the game. Plastic letters are very small and tend to lose their grip if not placed with slight lateral movement and if they are not perfectly clean. The game format is extremely small, allowing Scrabble games for backpackers and others concerned about weight and size.
 Hasbro Games, 2001 – hinged plastic board with clear tile-shaped depressions to hold tiles in play. Board is in a black, zippered folio such that board and tiles may be folded for travel, even with the game in play. The reverse side of the board contains numbered mounts for racks, holding tiles face down, allowing secure and confidential storage of tiles while a game is paused. Some versions have tile racks with individual tile slots, thus not permitting easy sorting of tiles in a rack.

Deluxe editions
At the opposite end, some "deluxe" or "prestige" editions offer superior materials and features. These include editions on a rotating turntable, so players can always face the board, with the letters upright and a raised grid that holds the tiles in place. Also available are alternative Scrabble boards, often made of glass or hardwood, that have superior rotating mechanisms and personalized graphics.

Large print and braille editions
An edition has been released (in association with the Royal National Institute of Blind People (RNIB)) with a larger board and letters for players with impaired vision. The colours on the board are more contrasting, and the font size has been increased from 16 to 24 point. The tiles are in bold 48 point, and have braille labels. A separate braille edition is also available.

Works related to Scrabble

Books
Numerous books about Scrabble have been published, including nonfiction titles helping players improve their game, and fiction titles using the game as a plot device. These include:

 Merriam-Webster's The Official Scrabble Player's Dictionary, the Sixth Edition of which was published in 2018. The OSPD is the consistently best-selling official Scrabble book.
 Word Freak by Stefan Fatsis (2001), an introduction to tournament Scrabble and its players. While writing the book, Fatsis became a high-rated tournament player.
 The Scrabble Player's Handbook, edited by Stewart Holden and Kenji Matsumoto, and written by an international group of tournament players, which gives the information a serious player needs to advance to successful tournament play. Not to be confused with Drue K. Conklin's 1976 The Official Scrabble Player's Handbook, The Scrabble Player's Handbook is available for free download.

Documentaries

Numerous documentaries have been made about the game, including:
 Scrabylon (2003), by Scott Petersen, which "gives an up-close look at why people get so obsessed with that seemingly benign game"
 Word Slingers (2002), by Eric Siblin and Stefan Vanderland (produced for Canadian Broadcasting Corporation (CBC)), which follows four expert Canadian players at the 2001 World Championship in Las Vegas
 Word Wars (2004) by Eric Chaikin and Julian Petrillo, about the "tiles and tribulations on the Scrabble game circuit"

See also
 Anagrams - Public domain game, predecessor to Scrabble
 Anamonic
 Blanagram
 Boggle
 Countdown (game show)
 RSVP (board game)
 Scrabble in Hong Kong
 Upwords
 Words with Friends
 Wordscraper

References

Further reading
 
 
   An article relating how Scrabble has been adapted to other languages, describing how it was prepared for the Tuvan languages, and giving directions about how to adapt it.

External links

 Scrabble at Hasbro.com
 Scrabble at MattelGames.com

 
 .GCG specification describes a computer file format for recording and annotating Scrabble games.
 Scrabble Word Database (Multi-language)
  – Game apparatus – Expired patent for the jagged edges of bonus squares, which were added so that one need not lift previously placed tiles in order to see the bonus.

Player associations
 Association of British Scrabble Players
 NASPA Games (formerly North American Scrabble Players Association; sanctions club and tournament play in North America)
 Scrabble Australia
 World English-Language Scrabble Players Association (WESPA)

 
Board games introduced in 1938
Game.com games
Multiplayer games
Tabletop games
Word board games
American board games
American inventions
Mattel games
Parker Brothers games
Selchow and Righter games